The ninth season of Dancing with the Stars was announced on Today Tonight, on 5 June 2009. Longtime weather presenter Jeff Newman appeared in a promo of Dancing to promote his retirement.

It debuted on 5 July 2009.

Couples

Scoring chart
Red numbers indicate the couples with the lowest score for each week.
Green numbers indicate the couples with the highest score for each week.
 indicates the couple (or couples) eliminated that week.
 indicates the returning couple that finished in the bottom two.
 indicates the couple withdrew from the competition.
 indicates the winning couple.
 indicates the runner-up couple.
 indicates the third-place couple.

In Week 9, a special 'Grand Final Lifeline' of 10 points was awarded to Kylie Gillies for winning the Aussie Smooth Dance Off.

Dance schedule
The celebrities and professional partners will dance one of these routines for each corresponding week.

 Week 1 : Cha-cha-cha or Waltz
 Week 2 : Rumba or Tango
 Week 3 : Jive or Foxtrot
 Week 4 : Salsa or Quickstep including a solo piece with a minimum of 15 seconds
 Week 5 : Paso doble or Aussie Smooth
 Week 6 : Samba or West Coast Swing
 Week 7 : Two unlearned dances (Week 1 to Week 6) to the theme of songs from the movies
 Week 8 : Two unlearned dances (Week 1 to Week 6)
 Week 9 : Judges choice, Segue & Aussie Smooth Dance Off
 Week 10 : One unlearned dance (Week 1 to 6), Cha-cha-cha show off & Freestyle

Dance chart

 Highest scoring dance
 Lowest scoring dance
 Winner of the Aussie Smooth dance-off
 Runner up of the Aussie Smooth dance-off
 Second eliminated in the Aussie Smooth dance-off
 First eliminated in the Aussie Smooth dance-off
 Performed but not scored

This dance was repeated by the couple at the finale.

Highest and lowest scoring performances 
The best and worst performances in each dance according to the judges' marks are as follows:

Couples' highest and lowest scoring dances
Scores are based upon a 30-point maximum:

Average chart

The average chart is based on the dances performed by celebrities and not their place in the competition.

Running Order
Individual judges scores in the chart below (given in parentheses) are listed in this order from left to right: Todd McKenney, Helen Richey,  Mark Wilson.''

Week 1 
 Musical guest: Mark Vincent—"You Raise Me Up"
Running order

Week 2 

Running order

Week 3 

Running order

Week 4 

Running order

Week 5 

Running order

Week 6 
 Musical guest: Pixie Lott—"Mama Do"

Running order

Week 7 

Running order

Week 8 

Running order

Week 9 
 Musical guest: Jimmy Barnes—"Hallelujah I Love Her So" and "Working Class Man"
Running order

Week 10 
 Musical guests: Jersey Boys—Medley:"Sherry"/"Walk Like a Man"/"Big Girls Don't Cry" and "Who Loves You" and Hugh Sheridan—"Just Can't Throw Us Away"
Running order

References

Season 09
2009 Australian television seasons